Don Manning is a former American football linebacker at the University of California, Los Angeles. He was a consensus All-American in 1967.

College career
Manning lettered for the UCLA Bruins football team under coach Tommy Prothro during the 1965, 1966 and 1967 seasons.  He made 1st team All-Coast team in both the 1966 and 1967 seasons.  In his final year, as a 6-foot, 2-inch, 204-pound Linebacker, Manning  was recognized as a consensus first-team All-American, having received first-team honors from several publications and organizations including the Walter Camp Foundation, and United Press International (UPI).  He was joined on the consensus All-American team by Gary Beban, marking the first time UCLA had two members in the same year.   Manning was drafted by the Cincinnati Bengals in the seventeenth round (436th overall) of the 1968 NFL Draft. In 1993, he was inducted into the UCLA Athletics Hall of Fame.

References

American football linebackers
All-American college football players
UCLA Bruins football players
Year of birth missing (living people)
Place of birth missing (living people)
Possibly living people